James "Jimmy" Carroll (December 20, 1955 – April 27, 2016) was an American-born Canadian actor and radio personality, best known for playing Max Sutton on Wind at My Back, which aired on CBC Television from 1996 to 2001. Most recently, Carroll found a second career as a community radio host and personality based in Huntsville, Ontario. Carroll initially joined Hunters Bay Radio (CKAR-FM) in 2010 as the host of a local afternoon radio show. However, he soon became involved in the growth of the community station, hosting a Top 20 countdown, a Motown show on Mondays, and a local talent show. Carroll helped Hunters Bay Radio expand from its origins as a small, online station broadcast from a household basement into a full FM radio station with a staff of 60 employees by 2016.

Early life and career
Carroll was born in Philadelphia, Pennsylvania in the United States. He moved from the U.S. to Toronto during the 1980’s after performing in stage productions in the Canadian city. In addition to acting, Carroll later worked as the stage manager at The Second City improv club in Toronto. His other television roles included Anne of Green Gables: A New Beginning in 2008, as well as commercials.

Carroll originally left the entertainment industry and moved to Huntsville, Ontario, to live closer to his daughter Emma. He soon became involved with Hunters Bay Radio, the local community radio station, as an afternoon host in 2010. Carroll and his colleagues oversaw the expansion of Hunters Bay Radio into a full FM station with 60 employees which now broadcasts across Muskoka's cottage country and the Almaguin Highlands.

Illness and death
Carroll was diagnosed with cancer in December 2015. Local Huntsville residents raised $22,000 for his medical expenses through a GoFundMe campaign. Many of Carroll's former acting colleagues held a benefit for him at the Algonquin Theatre in Huntsville in January 2016. Carroll was hospitalized in April 2016 as his health declined. Carroll died from complications from small cell lung cancer on April 27, 2016, at the age of 60.

Filmography

Film
Police Academy 4: Citizens on Patrol (1987) - Warehouse Supplier
Dirty Work (1998) - Middle-Aged Guy
Death to Smoochy (2002) - Reporter #2
Deep Sea 4D (2003) - Dive Master Jim Marx
DC 9/11: Time of Crisis (2003) - Robert Mueller
Anne of Green Gables: A New Beginning (2008) - Jeremiah Land

Television
Wind at My Back (1996-2001) - Max Sutton

Videogame
Where in the U.S.A. Is Carmen Sandiego? (1996)
Red Dead Redemption (2010) - Norman Deek

References

External links

1956 births
2016 deaths
Canadian male television actors
Canadian male film actors
Canadian male stage actors
Canadian male voice actors
Place of death missing
Canadian male video game actors
American emigrants to Canada
People from Huntsville, Ontario
Male actors from Pennsylvania
Male actors from Toronto